Good People in Times of Evil is the fifth collaborative live album by bassist Jonas Hellborg and guitarist Shawn Lane, released on 10 November 2000 through Bardo Records. For this line-up they are joined by percussionist V. Selvaganesh, and as such it is the first album by Hellborg and Lane to incorporate Indian music.

Critical reception

Rick Anderson of AllMusic gave Good People in Times of Evil 4.5 stars out of five, recommending it highly. He called it "beautiful in a way that challenges the ear" and "perhaps the most consistently lovely" of Hellborg's albums, whilst noting "Aga of the Ladies" and "Bhakti Ras" as highlights. He also praised the contributions of Selvaganesh and Lane, describing the latter as a "truly awe-inspiring" guitarist.

Track listing

Personnel
Jonas Hellborg – bass guitar, production
Shawn Lane – guitar
V. Selvaganesh – vocals, kanjira, udu
Ustad Sultan Khan – sarangi

References

External links
In Review: Hellborg/Lane/Selvaganesh "Good People In Times Of Evil" at Guitar Nine Records

Jonas Hellborg albums
Shawn Lane albums
2000 live albums
Collaborative albums